Adin Airport  is a county-owned public-use airport located one nautical mile (1.85 km) southwest of the central business district of Adin, an unincorporated community in Modoc County, California, United States.

Facilities and aircraft 
It has one runway designated 9/27 with an asphalt surface measuring 2,850 by 40 feet (869 x 12 m). For the 12-month period ending December 31, 2009, the airport had 200 general aviation aircraft operations, an average of 16 per month.

References

External links 
 Aerial image as of 3 August 1998 from USGS The National Map

Airports in Modoc County, California